Hari Om Sharan (26 September 1932 – 18 December 2007) was an Indian Hindu devotional singer and lyricist. He devoted most of his career to singing devotional songs in praise of Sita, Rama, and Hanuman. As a Bhajan singer in the 1970s he recorded albums such as Premanjali Pushpanjali, and Daata Ek Ram. During his musical career spanning over 35 years, he released over 20 Bhajan albums.

Biography

Early life
Shri Hari Om Sharan was born in Lahore, now in Pakistan, on 26 September 1932. His family migrated to India, after the Partition of India in 1947.

Recording career
He became a professional singer in 1973, singing his first album for HMV. During a trip to Guyana, he met Nandini, a Hindu Indo-Guyanese woman, whom he later married, and settled down with in India.

He appeared briefly in an English film, Holy Smoke! (1999), as a singer.

Singers pay tribute
In 2004, an album of Hari Om's bhajans, sung by the front runners of India's music industry, titled Hari Om – Salutation, was released. The contributors to this album included:  Pt. Jasraj, Pt. Shivkumar Sharma,  Sonu Nigam, Hariharan, Anup Jalota, Shankar Mahadevan, Richa Sharma, Sadhana Sargam, Shaan, Mahalaxmi Iyer, and Sunidhi Chauhan and was created by Neil Prashad. Percussionist Sivamani provides the backdrop.

Bhajans

Discography
 Pushpanjali (1972)
 Premanjali (1977)
 Sri Krishna Charit Maanas (Musical Drama – 1979)
 Jai Jai Shri Hanuman (1979)
 Devi Geet (1979)
 Sumiran (1980)
 Aaradhan (1981)
 Prabhupada Kripa (1981)
 Daata Ek Raam
 Bhakti Vandan
 Sri Hanuman Chalisa
 Aarti Archan
 Bhajan Uphaar
 Kabir Vani
 Chalo Man Vrindavan Ki Oor
 Bhajan Deepanjali
 Kahat Kabhir Suno Bhai Sadho
 Govind Ke Gun Ga Ley (1984)
 Sai Kripa (1984)
 Gunn Gaan (1994)
 Shiv Mahima (1994)
 Ram Bhakt Hanuman (1996)
 Sampoorna Sundara Kaand (1994)

Some rare songs worth special mention are "Koi Samjhe Bhakt" (Album:Gungaan); "Masjid kardi Dwarika","Vipda Mithanewale" (Album:Sai Kripa) and "Ab na bani to phir na banegi" (Album: Govind ke gun ga ley).

References

External links
 Hari Om Sharan all tracks on gaana.com
 Listen to Hari Om Sharan Bhajans online

1932 births
2007 deaths
Bhajan singers
Indian Hindus
Singers from Lahore
20th-century Indian singers